Rhinogobio ventralis is a species of cyprinid fish. It is endemic to the middle and upper reaches of the Yangtze in China.

References

ventralis
Cyprinid fish of Asia
Freshwater fish of China
Endemic fauna of China
Fish described in 1874
Taxa named by Henri Émile Sauvage